Dominica is an island-nation in the Caribbean Lesser Antilles.  The highest mountain peak on Dominica, at 4,747 ft, is Morne Diablotins, which is also the second highest mountain in the Lesser Antilles.

See also
List of volcanoes in Dominica
Mountain peaks of the Caribbean

References

External links

 
Geography of Dominica
Lists of landforms of Dominica
Dominica
Dominica geography-related lists
Dominica